Trinidad and Tobago–Venezuela relations refers to the bilateral relations between the Republic of Trinidad and Tobago and the Bolivarian Republic of Venezuela. Trinidad and Tobago has an Embassy in Caracas and Venezuela has an embassy in Port of Spain.

History
President Jaime Lusinchi of Venezuela became the first president of Venezuela to visit Trinidad and Tobago in 1986. An agreement was signed on technical, manufacturing, and fishing rights during his visit. Several Trinidadian Coast Guard members were taught Spanish to deal with future situations with Venezuelans. Despite signing fishing agreements, there were several Trinidadian ships seized by Venezuelans following the visit.

In recent years, Trinidad and Tobago has witnessed increased immigration from Venezuela, with an estimated 40,000 Venezuelans immigrating to the country by 2018. Relations have remained strained in recent years due to the pressure the large influx of Venezuelans places on healthcare and public services in the island nation. 16,500 Venezuelan refugees were granted temporary work visas and photo IDs for 6 months to a year.

Trade
CARICOM-Venezuela agreement on trade and investment eliminates tariffs on certain goods between Trinidad and other Caribbean nations and Venezuela. This includes duty-free access on specific products and elimination of tariffs for certain exports to Venezuela.

See also

 Foreign relations of Venezuela
 Foreign relations of Trinidad and Tobago

Notes and references

 
Trinidad and Tobago
Venezuela